What's Eating Gilbert Grape is a 1993 American coming-of-age drama film directed by Lasse Hallström, and starring Johnny Depp, Leonardo DiCaprio, Juliette Lewis and Darlene Cates. It follows 25-year-old Gilbert (Depp), a grocery store clerk caring for his mother (Cates) and his intellectually disabled younger brother Arnie (DiCaprio) in a sleepy Iowa town. Peter Hedges wrote the screenplay, based on his 1991 novel of the same name. Filming took place from November 1992 to January 1993 in various parts of Texas.

The film was well received, with Depp and DiCaprio's performances garnering critical acclaim. At the age of 19, DiCaprio received his first nominations for the Academy Award and Golden Globe Award for Best Actor in a Supporting Role, becoming the seventh-youngest Best Supporting Actor nominee for the former.

Plot
In the small town of Endora, Iowa, Gilbert Grape is busy caring for Arnie, his intellectually disabled younger brother who is turning 18, as they wait for the many tourists' trailers to pass through town during an annual Airstreamers' Club gathering at a nearby recreational area. His father had hanged himself seventeen years earlier, and since then his mother, Bonnie, has spent most of her days on the couch watching television and eating. With Bonnie's morbid obesity leaving her unable to care for her children on her own, Gilbert has taken responsibility for repairing the old house and being protective of Arnie, who has a habit of climbing the town water tower as well as trees, while his sisters Amy and Ellen do the other housework. A new FoodLand supermarket has opened, threatening the small Lamson's Grocery where Gilbert works. In addition, Gilbert is having an affair with a married woman, Betty Carver.

A young woman named Becky and her grandmother are stuck in town when the International Harvester Travelall pulling their trailer breaks down. Gilbert's unusual life circumstances threaten to get in the way of their budding romance. In order to spend time with Becky to watch the sunset, Gilbert leaves Arnie alone in the bath. He returns home late and finds that Arnie is still in the bath the following morning, shivering in the now cold water; his guilt is compounded by his family's anger and Arnie's subsequent aquaphobia. His affair with Betty ends when she leaves town in search of a new life following her husband's death; he drowned in the family's wading pool after having a heart attack. Becky becomes close to both Gilbert and Arnie. While they are distracted during one of their talks, Arnie returns to the water tower that he is always trying to climb. Arnie is arrested after being rescued from the top of the tower, causing his mother — who has not left the house in over seven years — to become the laughing stock of the town as she goes to the police station, forcing Arnie's release.

Soon after, Arnie ruins two expensive birthday cakes, tries to run away from his bath and in his frustration, Gilbert finally snaps, hitting Arnie several times. Guilty and appalled at himself, Gilbert flees and drives away in his truck. Arnie also runs out and goes to Becky, who takes care of him for the evening and helps him overcome his aquaphobia until he is picked up by his sisters. After some soul searching aided by Becky, Gilbert returns home during Arnie's 18th birthday party to make amends to his family for running out and receive Arnie's reluctant forgiveness. He also apologizes to his mother for his behavior and vows not to be ashamed of her or let her be hurt anymore. She acknowledges how much of a burden she has become to the family, and he forgives her. He introduces her to Becky — something he had been reluctant to do earlier.

Following the party, Bonnie climbs the stairs to her bedroom for the first time since her husband's suicide. Arnie later tries to wake her but discovers that she has died. With no way to remove her body from the second floor that evening, the police make plans to return with a crane the next day. Knowing there will be a crowd of people looking to get a laugh instead of paying their respects, the family, wanting to keep her death from becoming a joke, burns the house to the ground with her body still inside.

A year later, Amy gets a job managing a bakery in the Des Moines area while Ellen looks forward to switching schools and living in a bigger city. Gilbert waits by the side of the road with Arnie, now turning 19, waiting for the tourist trailers to come around again. As part of the convoy, Becky arrives with her grandmother and picks them both up, with Gilbert telling Arnie: "We can go anywhere."

Cast
 Johnny Depp as Gilbert Grape
 Leonardo DiCaprio as Arnold "Arnie" Grape
 Juliette Lewis as Rebecca "Becky"
 Mary Steenburgen as Elizabeth "Betty" Carver
 Darlene Cates as Bonnie Grape
 Laura Harrington as Amy Grape
 Mary Kate Schellhardt as Ellen Grape
 Kevin Tighe as Kenneth "Ken" Carver
 John C. Reilly as Tucker Van Dyke
 Crispin Glover as Robert "Bobby" McBurney
 Penelope Branning as Becky's Grandma
 Libby Villari as the Waitress

Production
Filming for What's Eating Gilbert Grape began on November 2, 1992, and concluded in late January 1993. It was shot in Texas, in various towns and cities; Austin and Pflugerville were primary locations, as well as Manor, where the water tower featured in the film was located.

Film Review quoted actor Leonardo DiCaprio:

Reception

The film had a limited release on December 17, 1993, and wide release on March 4, 1994. The wide release garnered $2,104,938 on its first weekend. It was considered a box office bomb, with the total domestic gross for the film being $10,032,765, although it gained a following later on.

The film received positive reviews, with many critics praising the performances by Depp and DiCaprio. The latter was singled out for his performance in the film, with many saying DiCaprio stole the film from the lead actor Depp. On Rotten Tomatoes, the film was given a 90% "Certified Fresh" score and an average rating of 7.40/10 based on 50 reviews. The site's consensus states: "It's sentimental and somewhat predictable, but those are small complaints, given the tender atmosphere and moving performances at the heart of What's Eating Gilbert Grape." Metacritic calculated an average score of 73 out of 100 based on 20 reviews, indicating "generally favorable reviews".

The New York Times film critic Janet Maslin praised DiCaprio's performance, writing "the film's real show-stopping turn comes from Mr. DiCaprio, who makes Arnie's many tics so startling and vivid that at first he is difficult to watch… The performance has a sharp, desperate intensity from beginning to end." Roger Ebert of Chicago Sun-Times described it as "… one of the most enchanting films of the year" and said that DiCaprio deserved to win the Academy Award for Best Supporting Actor for which he was nominated. Todd McCarthy of Variety found the film a "bemused view on life" and remarked that "Depp manages to command center screen with a greatly affable, appealing characterization." The Washington Posts Desson Howe thought the film was an earnest but highly predictable effort. Film Review praised Leonardo DiCaprio as the mentally disabled brother, calling it "a performance of astonishing innocence and spontaneity", bringing "a touching credibility to a very difficult part".

The film was nominated for the prestigious Grand Prix of the Belgian Syndicate of Cinema Critics.

Year-end lists 
 2nd – David Elliott, The San Diego Union-Tribune
 4th – Dan Craft, The Pantagraph
 7th – Stephen Hunter, The Baltimore Sun
 Honorable mention – Duane Dudek, Milwaukee Sentinel
 Honorable mention – Steve Persall, St. Petersburg Times
 Honorable mention – Bob Carlton, The Birmingham News

Accolades

See also
 List of oldest and youngest Academy Award winners and nominees – Youngest nominees for Best Actor in a Supporting Role
 66th Academy Awards
 51st Golden Globe Awards
65th National Board of Review Awards
6th Chicago Film Critics Association Awards
19th Los Angeles Film Critics Association Awards
1993 in film

References

External links

 
 

1993 films
1993 drama films
1990s coming-of-age drama films
American coming-of-age drama films
1990s English-language films
Films_about_autism
Films about brothers
Films about dysfunctional families
Films about grieving
Films about intellectual disability
Films about obesity
Films about siblings
Films based on American novels
Films based on romance novels
Films directed by Lasse Hallström
Films scored by Björn Isfält
Films set in Iowa
Films shot in Texas
Films about mother–son relationships
Paramount Pictures films
1990s American films
Films about disability